American R&B group TLC has released five studio albums, 13 compilation albums, six video albums, 25 singles (including four as a featured artist), 11 promotional singles, and 24 music videos.

They have attained four number-one singles on the US Billboard Hot 100: "Creep", "Waterfalls", "No Scrubs" and "Unpretty". The group have certified shipping of 23 million albums (including one certified diamond) and 11 million singles. In 2008, the group was inducted into the All Time Hot 100 Artist Hall of Fame by Billboard magazine at 56th place.

They have sold over 65 million records worldwide, and is considered one of the best-selling girl groups of all time (second to the Spice Girls).

Their second studio album, CrazySexyCool, has sold 15 million copies worldwide, and is recognized as the best-selling album of all time by a girl group in the United States.

Albums

Studio albums

Compilation albums

Singles

As lead artist

As featured artist

Promotional singles

Other charted songs

Guest appearances

Videography

Video albums

Music videos

Notes

References

External links
 
 
 
 

Discography
Discographies of American artists
Hip hop discographies
Rhythm and blues discographies